We're in the Navy Now is a 1926 American silent comedy film directed by A. Edward Sutherland and starring Wallace Beery and Raymond Hatton. An abridged version of the film survives.

Beery and Hatton previously appeared as a comedy team in Sutherland's Behind the Front and are reunited here. The "Beery and Hatton" part-time comedy team made four films together, including Fireman, Save My Child and Now We're in the Air with Louise Brooks.

Cast

References

External links

Lobby poster
Stills at silenthollywood.com

1926 films
American silent feature films
Films directed by A. Edward Sutherland
Paramount Pictures films
Silent American comedy films
American black-and-white films
1926 comedy films
1920s American films